Pieter Kollen (May 27, 1939—August 5, 2007) was an American figure skater and coach.  In 1962 he won the U.S. Figure Skating Championships in pair skating with partner Dorothyann Nelson, and also placed second in the ice dance competition at the same event.  They placed 8th in pairs and 7th in dance at the 1962 World Figure Skating Championships.

The following season, following Nelson's retirement from competitive skating, Kollen competed in pairs with new partner Patti Gustafson.  They placed 3rd at the US Championships and 9th at Worlds.   They were the first pair team to perform the throw axel, which was invented by their coach Ronald Ludington.

For many years following his own competitive career, Kollen was a coach at the Indiana/World Skating Academy in Indianapolis, Indiana.  He was the inventor of the "K-Pick"—an innovative skate blade design with the toe pick extended to the side of the blade.

Results
Pairs
(with Nelson)

Pairs
(with Gustafson)

Dance
(with Nelson)

References

 Obituary

American male pair skaters
American male ice dancers
American figure skating coaches
1939 births
2007 deaths
20th-century American people